The Canton of Moyenneville  is a former canton situated in the department of the Somme and in the Picardie region of northern France. It was disbanded following the French canton reorganisation which came into effect in March 2015. It had 9,426 inhabitants (2012).

Geography 
The canton is organised around the commune of Moyenneville in the arrondissement of Abbeville. The altitude varies from 3m at Cahon to 121m at Feuquières-en-Vimeu for an average of 77m.

The canton comprised 14 communes:

Acheux-en-Vimeu
Béhen
Cahon
Chépy
Ercourt
Feuquières-en-Vimeu
Grébault-Mesnil
Huchenneville
Miannay
Moyenneville
Quesnoy-le-Montant
Saint-Maxent
Tœufles
Tours-en-Vimeu

Population

See also
 Arrondissements of the Somme department
 Cantons of the Somme department
 Communes of the Somme department

References

Moyenneville
2015 disestablishments in France
States and territories disestablished in 2015